Pochvalov is a municipality and village in Rakovník District in the Central Bohemian Region of the Czech Republic. It has about 300 inhabitants.

History
The first written mention of Pochvalov is from 1346.

References

External links

Villages in Rakovník District